The Government House Leader (fr: Leader du gouvernement) is a Member of the National Assembly (MNA) chosen by the Premier of Quebec to be in charge of strategy and procedure for the group of Members who support the government in the Assembly.

The role of Government House Leader is now codified in the Standing Orders of the National Assembly.

Two other MNAs are Deputy Government House Leader (fr: Leader adjoint du gouvernement). They assist the Government House Leader and replace him when required.

List of Government House Leaders:

Notes and references

See also
Politics of Quebec

Westminster system
Political terminology in Canada
Government of Quebec